The Moorabbin Air Museum is an aviation museum at Moorabbin Airport in Melbourne, Victoria, Australia. It was founded in 1962 as the Australian Aircraft Restoration Group, in an attempt to maintain a World War II-era Bristol Beaufighter aircraft. It has since become a museum, with a large aircraft collection. It was known as the Australian National Aviation Museum up until October 2021. As of 2021 it held nearly 60 aircraft and 25 engines.

History

The Australian Aircraft Restoration Group was first formed in 1962 as a volunteer group by aviation enthusiasts including members of the Aviation Historical Society of Australia.

The first home for the collection was on a farm in Wandin North then the Pine Hill Service Station, on the Warburton road, outside of Lillydale, Victoria. The museum aircraft were stored there with the Wackett trainer, donated by the Lucas family, displayed prominently.  In 1965 land was allocated for a museum at Moorabbin Airport, Victoria.

The collection in the early days was made up of a combination of privately owned aircraft and those the Museum acquired in their own right .

Amongst the first acquisitions was DAP Mark 21 Bristol Beaufighter A8-328 ex Royal Australian Air Force (RAAF) that had been used as playground equipment at The Lord Mayor's Children's Camp at Portsea and was at risk of being scrapped.

Following donation of the Beaufighter in April 1962, a CAC Wackett was donated by the Lucas family, followed by the oldest complete aircraft in the collection, a DH.60G Gypsy Moth.

1963 was a busy year for the group. In January an Avro Anson was purchased from Flinders Island Airlines, ( VH-FIA) and in May a Gloster Meteor was acquired from the Department of Supply. Trans Australia Airlines (TAA) donated a Tiger Moth in mid-1963, and the year was rounded out by recovering a CAC Wirraway from the dump at East Sale RAAF base .

Early in 1964, most of the collection was moved to a service station north of Lilydale, where the Wacket was put on display where it remained until moved to Moorabin . Later in the year many of the aircraft were taken to a market garden adjacent to Moorabbin Airport. In October 1964, a Percival Proctor was donated, and by this stage the Department of Civil Aviation had agreed to lease the group land at Moorabbin Airport, with a fence erected on 20 May 1965.

In 1966, the AARG returned to the farming district near Colac and collected a Kittyhawk fuselage, while February 1967 saw the most spectacular arrival when a former Royal Australian Navy (RAN) Fairey Firefly was flown from Bankstown in New South Wales to Moorabbin.

For the next 20 years the Museum grew as more and more aircraft came into the collection and the theme of the Museum was quickly established. An aircraft or artefact acquired by the Museum had to be relevant to Australian aviation history. Without realising it the Museum was establishing what would be labelled by museum professionals years later as a collection policy. This theme is what held the Museum collection together and provided a sense of purpose to the collection. Other aviation museums would form in Australia but none would acquire the vast range of aircraft types, all of which related directly to Australian history. The collection ranges from gliders and homebuilts to World War II combat aircraft, jet fighters, crop dusters and four engine airliners.

1980s and Beyond
By the early 1980s the aircraft collection had grown to a very impressive 30 machines but another very hard lesson had been learned. Collecting aircraft, restoring them and displaying them was not enough. At this time the Museum was still an open-air display and the effects of the weather were beginning to play havoc with the aircraft. No matter how robustly constructed an aircraft may be, if it is left exposed to the elements it will eventually succumb.

During the 1970s and 1980s there had been various proposals put forward by government and private groups to fund a National Aviation Museum in Victoria. The Moorabbin Air Museum was involved in many of these deliberations, but by the late 1980s it had become apparent that none of these schemes would reach fruition. The Museum directors realised that the only way to ensure the long-term survival of the aircraft was to take action themselves, and in 1988 all surplus assets of the museum were sold in order to provide funds to erect an 8,000-square-foot hangar on the Museum site. In April 1989 that hangar was completed and three years later it was extended to 12,000 square feet. In the intervening years a library, workshop and store were also erected together with an entry building and shop.

Over the years the Moorabbin Air Museum has been recognised by a number of awards, the most prestigious of which was a Certificate of Merit in the 1985 Museum of the Year Awards. Apart from the preservation of aircraft, the Museum's other great accomplishment has been the number of young members who have gone on to careers in aviation or museology; the experience gained while at the Museum standing them in good stead in their working lives.

To many it would seem that the Museum has accomplished its goals, but in truth it has barely begun. Between 1980 and 2000 the aircraft collection increased by an average of one airframe per year. The collection now totals 52 machines, and that makes the Museum the largest aircraft owner on Moorabbin Airport. It is an aeronautical collection larger than half the world's airlines and a third of the world's air forces, and only one third of it is displayed under cover. The rest is in storage, on loan, under restoration or, at worst, on display in the open air.

In September 2021, the Museum was granted a lease on land opposite the current site, increasing total size by around 4000sqm. A new facility will be built there as part of Stage One of the Community Heritage Precinct, and will finally see all aircraft undercover and protected for the first time in the Museum's history.

Aircraft in collection

See also
List of aerospace museums

Notes

References
Goodall, Geoff (2008). Warbirds Directory. Australia: Geoff Goodall. (CD-ROM) 
Ogden, Bob (2008). Aviation Museums and Collections of The Rest of the World. UK: Air-Britain. .

External links 

Australian National Aviation Museum website
Facebook page
Tumblr page

Museums established in 1962
Museums in Melbourne
Aerospace museums in Australia
1962 establishments in Australia
Military and war museums in Australia